Merriam is an unincorporated community in Noble Township, Noble County, in the U.S. state of Indiana.

History
A post office was established at Merriam in 1853, and remained in operation until it was discontinued in 1907. According to Ronald L. Baker, the name may honor Mason M. Merriam or a member of his family. Mason M. Merriam operated a local store in the 1840s.

Geography

References

Unincorporated communities in Noble County, Indiana
Unincorporated communities in Indiana